Çalören is a town in the District of Şereflikoçhisar, Ankara Province, Turkey.

References

Populated places in Ankara Province
Şereflikoçhisar
Towns in Turkey